North West Leicestershire is a local government district in Leicestershire, England. The population of the Local Authority at the 2011 census was 93,348.   Its main towns are Ashby-de-la-Zouch, Castle Donington, Coalville and Ibstock.

The district contains East Midlands Airport, which operates flights to the rest of Britain and to various places in Europe. It is also notable as the location of Castle Donington and Donington Park, a grand-prix circuit and a major venue for music festivals.

The district is represented in the UK Parliament by the constituency of the same name.

The area has a long history of mineral extraction, with coal, brick clay, gravel and granite amongst the products. All the deep coal mines in the area have closed, but opencast mining still continues.

The district was formed in 1974 by a merger of Ashby de la Zouch Urban District, Ashby Woulds Urban District, Coalville Urban District, Ashby de la Zouch Rural District, Castle Donington Rural District and Ibstock from the Market Bosworth Rural District.

Politics

Like many other shire districts, authority over North West Leicestershire is shared between the district council and the county council. Areas of responsibility of the district council include local planning, building control, council housing, refuse collection, recycling, and some leisure services and parks.

The district council is currently controlled by 38 councillors who are elected every four years; the last election took place in May 2019 and saw the Conservatives hold on to control. The current political make-up of the council is as follows:

The council has a five-member executive known as the Cabinet which is made up of councillors who have special responsibilities and power. As the Conservatives won overall control of the council in 2007, they hold all of the seats on the cabinet.

Parishes
Appleby Magna, Acresford, Ashby Woulds, Ashby-de-la-Zouch,
Bardon, Belton, Breedon on the Hill
Castle Donington, Charley, Chilcote, Coleorton, Coalville
Ellistown and Battleflat
Heather, Hugglescote and Donington le Heath
Ibstock, Isley cum Langley
Kegworth
Lockington-Hemington, Long Whatton and Diseworth
Measham
Normanton le Heath
Oakthorpe and Donisthorpe, Osgathorpe
Packington
Ravenstone with Snibston
Snarestone, Staunton Harold, Stretton en le Field, Swannington, Swepstone
Whitwick, Worthington

Human Geography

North West Leicestershire has experienced steady population growth in recent times as the district balances the agro-rural economy with the end of labour-intensive deep coal-mining. Alternative employment opportunities exist within the district in the services and distributive sectors, together with local or nearby manufacturing and extractive/transformative/construction industries. The lack of rail services to/from Leicester, Loughborough and other nearby centres limits access for employment, commerce and leisure to a road journey that competes with freight and heavy-haulage vehicles especially to the south and east.

Economy 

Since 2013 Norton Motorcycles has its head office in Donington Hall, Castle Donington. BMI (British Midland), an airline, was headquartered in Donington Hall. The airline moved its headquarters to Donington Hall in 1982. The subsidiary bmibaby also had its head office in Donington Hall.

Prior to its disestablishment, Excalibur Airways had its head office on the grounds of East Midlands Airport in Castle Donington. Prior to its disestablishment, Orion Airways had its head office on the grounds of East Midlands Airport.

Arms

References

External links

 North West Leicestershire

 
Non-metropolitan districts of Leicestershire